Ancistrus clementinae is a species of catfish in the family Loricariidae. It is native to South America, where it occurs in the Pozuelos River basin, which is part of the Guayas River drainage in Ecuador. The species reaches 10.2 cm (4 inches) SL.

References 

clementinae
Fish described in 1937
Fish of Ecuador